Poecilominettia is a genus of flies in the family Lauxaniidae. There are more than 60 described species in Poecilominettia.

Species
These 69 species belong to the genus Poecilominettia:

 Poecilominettia acuta Broadhead, 1989
 Poecilominettia aurita Broadhead, 1989
 Poecilominettia biprojecta Broadhead, 1989
 Poecilominettia breviplumata Hendel, 1932
 Poecilominettia brunneicosta (Malloch, 1928)
 Poecilominettia calva Broadhead, 1989
 Poecilominettia chelata Broadhead, 1989
 Poecilominettia circularis Broadhead, 1989
 Poecilominettia circumtexta Broadhead, 1989
 Poecilominettia cordata Broadhead, 1989
 Poecilominettia cornuta Broadhead, 1989
 Poecilominettia curvata Broadhead, 1989
 Poecilominettia effossa Broadhead, 1989
 Poecilominettia enormis Broadhead, 1989
 Poecilominettia epacra Broadhead, 1989
 Poecilominettia erymna Broadhead, 1989
 Poecilominettia falcata Broadhead, 1989
 Poecilominettia fimbriata Broadhead, 1989
 Poecilominettia flavescens Broadhead, 1989
 Poecilominettia foliacea Broadhead, 1989
 Poecilominettia folleata Broadhead, 1989
 Poecilominettia fornicata Broadhead, 1989
 Poecilominettia fortuna Broadhead, 1989
 Poecilominettia fortunae Broadhead, 1989
 Poecilominettia fumida Broadhead, 1989
 Poecilominettia fungivora Broadhead, 1989
 Poecilominettia gatuna Broadhead, 1989
 Poecilominettia grata (Wiedemann, 1830)
 Poecilominettia lagenata Broadhead, 1989
 Poecilominettia legnota Broadhead, 1989
 Poecilominettia lineolata Broadhead, 1989
 Poecilominettia macula (Loew, 1872)
 Poecilominettia maniculata Broadhead, 1989
 Poecilominettia membranosa Broadhead, 1989
 Poecilominettia nigriapica Broadhead, 1989
 Poecilominettia notata Broadhead, 1989
 Poecilominettia obtusa Broadhead, 1989
 Poecilominettia octovittata (Williston, 1896)
 Poecilominettia ordinaria (Melander, 1913)
 Poecilominettia papillata Broadhead, 1989
 Poecilominettia paronatia Broadhead, 1989
 Poecilominettia parouatia Broadhead, 1989
 Poecilominettia pectinata Broadhead, 1989
 Poecilominettia pedata Broadhead, 1989
 Poecilominettia picticornis (Coquillett, 1904)
 Poecilominettia plicata Broadhead, 1989
 Poecilominettia puncticeps (Coquillett, 1902)
 Poecilominettia punctifer (Malloch, 1920)
 Poecilominettia pygmaea Broadhead, 1989
 Poecilominettia quadrata (Malloch, 1928)
 Poecilominettia quadriprojecta Broadhead, 1989
 Poecilominettia remata Broadhead, 1989
 Poecilominettia semilunata Broadhead, 1989
 Poecilominettia sentosa Broadhead, 1989
 Poecilominettia sexiprojecta Broadhead, 1989
 Poecilominettia sexseriata Hendel, 1932
 Poecilominettia silbergliedi Broadhead, 1989
 Poecilominettia silvicola Broadhead, 1989
 Poecilominettia slossonae (Coquillett, 1898)
 Poecilominettia spinosa Broadhead, 1989
 Poecilominettia trigona Broadhead, 1989
 Poecilominettia tripuncticeps (Malloch, 1926)
 Poecilominettia uncata Broadhead, 1989
 Poecilominettia ungulata Broadhead, 1989
 Poecilominettia unicolor Hendel, 1932
 Poecilominettia valida (Walker, 1858)
 Poecilominettia vibrata Broadhead, 1989
 Poecilominettia virgea Broadhead, 1989
 Poecilominettia zebroides (Hendel, 1926)

References

Further reading

 

Lauxaniidae
Articles created by Qbugbot
Lauxanioidea genera